Margaret Olofsson Bergman was a Pacific Northwest weaver, teacher, and designer. During the 1930s, Bergman designed and patented two looms: the Bergman Suitcase loom and the Bergman Floor loom. Each loom was designed with unique folding frames that enabled the loom to collapse even when fully warped. Her husband John and son Arthur built looms at their home in Breidablick, near Poulsbo, Washington. Later, a section of a barn on the property was converted to a store called the Yarn Barn where yarn could be purchased. She also was the founder of several weaving guilds and developed a weaving structure called the 'Margaret Bergman technique'.

Notes

External links
The Living Legacy of Margaret Bergman
Margaret Bergman bio on Snilleriket (Swedish)
Nordic Heritage Museum
Marker at Breidablik Evergreen Cemetery

1872 births
1948 deaths
20th-century American inventors
American weavers
People from Jämtland County
Swedish emigrants to the United States
People from Poulsbo, Washington
Women inventors
Women textile artists